Ercole Rabitti (24 August 1921 – 28 May 2009) was an Italian football striker and manager from Turin. Over the course of his career he played for nine teams, spending most of his time with Juventus and Como.

Honours
Juventus
Coppa Italia: 1941–42

Como
Serie B: 1948–49

References

1921 births
2009 deaths
Italian footballers
Serie A players
Juventus F.C. players
Spezia Calcio players
Casale F.B.C. players
Como 1907 players
A.C. Ancona players
Association football forwards
Italian football managers
Juventus F.C. managers
Torino F.C. managers
A.C. Cuneo 1905 players
A.S.D. Fanfulla players